Kazi Abdul Kader (1914–2002) was a Pakistani and later Bangladeshi politician. He served as a member of parliament in both the East Pakistan Provincial Assembly and Bangladesh Jatiya Sangsad.

Early life 
Kader was born in 1914 within Rangpur, British India.

Political career

Pakistan 
Kader served as a central minister in the government of East Pakistan. He was the Food & Agriculture Minister of the erstwhile East Pakistan government and a leader of the Convention Muslim League.

Bangladesh 
Kader contested the second Bangladeshi general election in 1979 on a ticket from the Muslim League. He contested from the seat Rangpur-3 and won the constituency. He contested again from the Muslim League during the 1991 Bangladeshi general election, this time from Nilphamari-3. He came in fifth place with 4,834 votes (4.34%).

Personal life 
Kader was married twice. His first wife was Lutfa Kader from Murshidabad, West Bengal, India and he had six sons and one daughter with her. She is believed to be a) is an honorific title denoting people accepted as descendants of the Islamic prophet Muhammad. His second wife was Nawabzadi Kaniz Fatema of the Dhaka nawab family. She was the daughter of Nawabzadi Khurshid Bano (daughter of Nawab Bahadur Sir Khwaja Salimullah). Kader's eldest son is Kazi Faruq Kader. Faruq served as the member of parliament twice from Nilphamari-3, the last time being from 2008 to 2014.

Death 
Kader died on 2 October 2002 in his Gulshan residence in Dhaka. He died from old-age complications at the age of 88.

References

Pakistani politicians
1914 births
2002 deaths
2nd Jatiya Sangsad members